Loaded Gun may refer to:

Film and TV
Loaded Guns (Italian: Colpo in canna), a 1975 Italian action movie

Music
Loaded Gun (album), by Gloryhound 2014
Loaded Gun, video album by Flatfoot 56
Loaded Gun, EP by Dead Horse 2014

Songs
"Loaded Gun", song by The Dead 60s from The Dead 60s
"Loaded Gun", song by Widescreen Mode
"Loaded Gun", song by Tyler Hilton 2012
"Loaded Gun", song by Black Rebel Motorcycle Club from B.R.M.C.
"Loaded Gun", song by Slaughter from Stick It Live
"Loaded Gun", song by Lightning Dust
"Loaded Gun", song by Bret Michaels from Songs of Life
"Loaded Gun", song by The Reverend Horton Heat from The Full-Custom Gospel Sounds of the Reverend Horton Heat
"Loaded Gun", song by Elemeno P from Elemeno P
"Loaded Gun", a song by Joe Budden
"Loaded Gun", song by American Steel 1999
"Loaded Gun", song by Katalyst from What's Happening (featuring Joe Volk)
"Loaded Gun", song by Swedish Erotica
"Loaded Gun", song by Airbourne from No Guts. No Glory.
"Loaded Gun", song by Medication from Prince Valium
"Loaded Gun", song by Dionysus from Sign of Truth
"Loaded Gun", song by Hednoize from La Femme Nikita: Music from the Television Series
"Loaded Gun", song by Wrench in the Works from Lost Art of Heaping Coal
"Loaded Gun", song by Ruby Joe from Hot Rod Deluxe 1999
"Loaded Gun", song by Quiet Riot from Terrified 1994
"Loaded Gun", a song by Starrs & Murph which was produced by AraabMuzik
"Loaded Gun", a track on the Total Nonstop Action Wrestling album Delirium